The Beast that Shouted Love at the Heart of the World is a short story collection by American writer  Harlan Ellison, published in 1969. It contains one of the author's most famous stories, "A Boy and His Dog", adapted into a film of the same name. "The Beast That Shouted Love at the Heart of the World" won the 1969 Hugo Award for Best Short Story, while "A Boy and His Dog" was first published in New Worlds  nominated for a Hugo Award for Best Novella and won the 1970 Nebula Award for Best Novella.

Contents
"Introduction: The Waves in Rio"
"The Beast that Shouted Love at the Heart of the World"
"Along the Scenic Route"
"Phoenix"
"Asleep: With Still Hands"
"Santa Claus vs. S.P.I.D.E.R."
"Try a Dull Knife"
"The Pitll Pawob Division"
"The Place With No Name"
"White on White"
"Run for the Stars"
"Are You Listening?"
"S.R.O."
"Worlds to Kill"
"Shattered Like a Glass Goblin"
"A Boy and His Dog"

References on other media

 "The Beast that Shouted Love at the Heart of the World" is also one of the titles shown on the last episode of the Neon Genesis Evangelion anime series.

1969 short story collections
Short story collections by Harlan Ellison
Avon (publisher) books